A cultural institution or cultural organization is an organization within a culture/subculture that works for the preservation or promotion of culture. The term is especially used of public and charitable organizations, but its range of meaning can be very broad. Examples of cultural institutions in modern society are museums, libraries, archives, churches, art galleries, theaters, concert halls and opera houses.

See also 

 Art world
 Confucius Institute
 GLAM (industry sector)

References

External links
 

Social institutions